Amikhelline is an antimitotic drug. It acts as a DNA intercalator and inhibits DNA polymerase.

References 

Antineoplastic and immunomodulating drugs
Benzofuran ethers at the benzene ring
Furanochromones
DNA intercalaters
DNA polymerase inhibitors
Diethylamino compounds